Isaac Asimov's Robot City: Perihelion is a book written in 1988 by William F. Wu. It is part of the series Isaac Asimov's Robot City, which was inspired by Isaac Asimov's Robot series.

Plot summary 
Derec, Ariel, their alien companion Wolruf, and Derec's robot Mandelbrot have returned to Robot City to convince Dr. Avery to remove the Chemfets he injected into Derec's blood while they were in his custody. From the top the Compass Tower they descend into the apartment on the uppermost floor.  There they use the computer terminal to begin their search for the location of Dr. Avery, but have no luck.

Derec's condition is worsening quickly, so it is decided that Mandelbrot and Wolruf will enter the city and try to gain useful information. Wolruf being non-human and Mandelbrot being a robot allows them a bit of anonymity since Derek and Ariel would most certainly be noticed and reported.

Mandelbrot obtains a work assignment from the Central Computer and learns that all work is being automated to the point where it can be performed by "function robots", robots without positronic brains, after which only a skeleton crew of robots would be needed. All positronic robots have also been programmed with "Migration Programming" which is executed upon completion of their tasks, but Mandelbrot is unable to learn what Migration Programming is.

While Mandelbrot and Wolruf are away, Derec gets even worse, and Ariel decides they can't wait for Mandelbrot and Wolruf's return and must leave the apartment now.  Moving around seems to ease some of Derec's symptoms.  As the descend into the Compass Tower, they run into Euler, a robot they met the first time they were in Robot City. He acts in an odd way and attempts to restrain them, but they get away.

As they exit Compass Tower, they are immediately captured by Hunter Robots and placed on a truck for transport. Mandelbrot arrives and convinces the driver to let him drive instead. Mandelbrot swerves several times putting the Hunters off balance allowing Derec and Ariel to push them out of the vehicle. They escape with the truck and find a hiding spot.

Soon afterwards, Jeff returns in a spacecraft to make good in his offer to help Derek and Ariel escape. He lands near the Compass Tower, but is immediately taken into custody by a Hunter. Mandelbrot, seeing the landing, arrives in time to save Jeff from the Hunter and the two make their getaway. After meeting with Derek and Ariel and being updated on the situation, they decide to board Jeff's ship and search for Dr. Avery from orbit.  Despite the Hunters having anticipated this move, they are able to avoid capture and make it to orbit.

From orbit they see that Robot City now covers the entire planet. They find a small group of farm fields, however, and assume that is food being grown for Dr. Avery, currently the only human inhabitant, and that his lair must be near them. Upon landing, Mandelbrot and Wolruf debark while Jeff take the three humans back into orbit to wait.

Mandelbrot and Wolruf, find the city all but abandoned in the area.  Apparently, almost the entire robot population has executed their Migration Programming and left.  Wolruf makes it to the woods near the fields, but is being pursued by Hunters. Mandelbrot fakes a defect and allows itself to be taken to a repair facility.  Upon leaving the facility, a rogue robot general alert is raised, so Hunters are back on its trail.

While waiting in orbit, Derec's condition continues to deteriorate and Jeff and Ariel decide to land and find Dr. Avery for themselves. They land near the field and exit quickly.  Once in the field, they decide the best way to interrupt the Migration Programming of the city's robots is to commit a crime since the robots have clearly shown they have difficulty dealing with them. They stop a robot and use Derec's condition to convince it that the robot had harmed him. The robot shuts down due to its belief it had broken the first of the Three Laws of Robotics, the harming of a human.

Deceiving this robot only buys them time and soon the Hunters are on them again. Jeff makes a break for it alone attempting to distract them since Derec has deteriorated to the point where he can't run or even move. Derek and Ariel attempt to hide in the field and find what looks like a vent leading down into the ground. At the risk of being caught, the jump into it and slide down, apparently into Dr. Avery's lair. Once at the bottom, Derec can no longer continue, so Ariel does on her own.

As she continues, she enters a bizarre maze filled with likenesses of Derec and others she has encountered during her time in Robot City. She makes her way through the maze and eventually enters a chamber reminiscent of a medieval king's dining hall. There she finds Dr. Avery.

Though she doesn't remember Dr. Avery, it is clear they have met before. Soon, the others are brought to the chamber by Hunters; Jeff, Derec, Wolruf, and Mandelbrot. It is revealed that Derec real name is actually David Avery, Dr. Avery's son. Ariel and David (Derec) had once had a relationship which Dr. Avery didn't approve of. Dr. Avery had inflicted them both with Amnemonic Plague and split them up in order to end the relationship. A plan that obviously didn't work.

Furthermore, he injected Derec with the Chemfets so he would become the eventual ruler of the Robot City robots, but not only the robots in Robot City, but the robots of all of the Robot Cities. It turns out the Migration Programming is sending all of the robots in Robot City to other planets via the "Keys of Perihelion" to begin building Robot Cities everywhere, invading and colonizing every planet they can find.

During this conversation, the Chemfets finally finish their process within Derec. Not only is he physically normal again, he finds that he has complete control of all of the robots of Robot City. With this power he easily halts the Migration Programming process and recalls the robots. This enrages Dr. Avery and before Derec can order a Hunter to subdue him, he produces a "Key of Perihelion" from his pocket and disappears.

Tired and happy, their adventure over, Derec finally kisses Ariel.

External links 
 Isaac Asimov's Robot-Empire-Foundation Series Timeline
 

1988 novels
1988 science fiction novels